Schubart may refer to:

Christian Friedrich Daniel Schubart (1739–1791), German poet
Peter Schubart von Ehrenberg (1668–unknown), painter from Vienna, son of Willem Schubart von Ehrenberg
Rikke Schubart (born 1966), Danish author
Wilhelm Schubert van Ehrenberg (1630 or 1637–1676), Flemish painter
Wilhelm Schubart (1873–1960), German ancient historian
1911 Schubart, outer main-belt asteroid, named after the German astronomer Joachim Schubart (born 1928)